Team Sleep is the debut, and so far only, studio album by American rock band Team Sleep. It was largely produced by Greg Wells. It was released in Europe on May 9, 2005 and a day later in the United States through Maverick Records.

Recording history
The debut album by Team Sleep was supposed to be released in 2003 but was scrapped due to the premature leakage of demos from the album onto the internet. The band split for a brief period of time before joining together and making material for a new album. Issues with Maverick Records as well as commitments with other projects (most specifically singer Chino Moreno and his band Deftones) delayed the release of the album numerous times. In early 2005, the official May 10 release was announced for the States with the announcement of a new track list and a band site on Maverick's web site.

Some of the songs presented on the new album are altered or re-recorded versions of older Team Sleep songs. For example, "Ever" is actually one of Team Sleep's oldest songs, originally titled "Cambodia" and later "Foreign Flag". "Live from the Stage" is a restructured version of the original Team Sleep song "Natalie Portman". "King Diamond" appears remastered, with Mary Timony contributing extensive call-and-response vocals. "Tomb of Liegia" is a little-changed update of leaked song "Ligeia", also featuring Timony. The title of the song references Edgar Allan Poe's short story, "Ligeia", and its Roger Corman/Vincent Price film adaptation, while the lyrics are more broadly Poe-esque.

Artwork
The cover photo was shot by Lionel Deluy while the creative direction was led by Frank Maddocks (a Deftones companion since 2000's White Pony).

Commercial performance 
The album debuted at #52 on the Billboard 200, selling 18,159 copies in its first week.

Track listing

Personnel
DJ Crook – drum programming (tracks: 2, 4, 6, 7, 8, 10, 11, 12, 15); turntables (tracks: 4, 5, 6, 8, 10, 12, 14, 15); keyboards (tracks: 6, 10, 14)
Zach Hill – drums (tracks: 3, 4, 5, 7, 9, 11, 13, 15); piano (track 3); bass drum and xylophone (track 11)
Todd Wilkinson – guitar (all tracks, except 12); keyboards (tracks: 3, 4, 9); bass (tracks: 4, 9, 11)
Rick Verrett – bass (tracks: 1, 5, 7, 13, 15); guitar (track 1); keyboards (tracks: 1, 3, 4, 5, 7, 12)
Chino Moreno – vocals (tracks: 1, 2, 3, 5, 7, 11, 12, 13, 15); guitar (tracks: 2, 5, 13); piano and keyboards (track 8)

Guests
DJ C-Minus – drum programming (track 1)
Greg Wells – piano (track 2)
Dan Elkan – guitar (track 3)
Sonny Mayugba – guitar (track 5)
Rob Crow – vocals (track 4, 7, 9 and 15)
Mary Timony – vocals (track 8 and 12)

Release history

Charts

References

Team Sleep albums
2005 debut albums
Maverick Records albums
Albums produced by Greg Wells
Albums produced by Ross Robinson